John Anderson Gilruth  (17 February 1871 – 4 March 1937) was a Scottish-Australian veterinary scientist and administrator. He is particularly noted for being Administrator of the Northern Territory from 1912 to 1918, when he was recalled after an angry mob demanded that he resign. This incident is known as the Darwin Rebellion.

Early life and education
John Anderson Gilruth was born in Auchmithie near Arbroath on 17 February 1871, the son of Andrew Gilruth.

He was educated at Arbroath High School and the High School of Dundee, then served two years as clerk to an Arbroath solicitor before going to Glasgow Veterinary College, now the Faculty of Veterinary Medicine at the University of Glasgow in 1887. He was admitted to membership of the Royal College of Veterinary Surgeons, London, in 1892.

Career
After qualifying, Gilruth then accepted appointment as a government veterinary surgeon in New Zealand and moved there in 1893. He spent three years investigating stock diseases, then went to Paris, France, to spend a year studying bacteriology at the Pasteur Institute.

In 1896, on returning to New Zealand, he was appointed chief veterinarian and government bacteriologist. He was appointed to a royal commission on public health and subsequently, in 1901, pathologist in the new Department of Public Health.

In 1907 he was elected a fellow of the Royal Society of Edinburgh; his proposers were Frederick Hobday, Sir John McFadyean, John Berry Haycraft, and Sir Edward Albert Sharpey-Schafer.

In 1908, he accepted the foundation chair of veterinary pathology at the University of Melbourne.

He retired in 1935.

Publications
Gilruth published many studies and articles on veterinary research in professional journals.

Recognition
In 1933 he was elected president of the Australian Veterinary Association, and in 1936 was awarded honorary membership.

Death and legacy
Gilruth died of a respiratory infection on 4 March 1937 at his home at South Yarra, Melbourne.

Several entities were named in his honour:
Gilruth Plains, a research station near Cunnamulla, Queensland, Australia
Gilruth Prize, the "most prestigious award" of the Australian Veterinary Association
Gilruth Avenue, Darwin

A portrait of Gilruth, painted by Will Longstaff, hangs in the Australian Animal Health Laboratory in Geelong, Victoria.

Personal life
Gilruth married Jennie McKay (née McLay) on 20 March 1899 at Dunedin, New Zealand. A son and two daughters survived him.

References

Further reading

 Alcorta, F. X. (1984). Darwin Rebellion. Northern Territory University Planning Authority, Darwin 
 Jensen, H. I. (1966). The Darwin Rebellion. Labour History, no 11, November 1966, pp 3–13. Canberra. 
 John Anderson Gilruth (2008). Northern Territory Government Administrators. 

1871 births
1937 deaths
People from Angus, Scotland
People educated at the High School of Dundee
Alumni of the University of Glasgow
Administrators of the Northern Territory
Fellows of the Royal Society of Edinburgh
History of the Northern Territory
Australian scientists
Scottish emigrants to Australia
Scottish pathologists
Scottish veterinarians
Veterinary scientists
Academic staff of the University of Melbourne